Frans Pourbus is the name of:
 Frans Pourbus the Younger (1569–1622), Flemish painter, son of Frans Pourbus the Elder
 Frans Pourbus the Elder (1545–1581), Flemish painter, father of Frans Pourbus the younger